Stephen Gill (born 28 September 1957) is a New Zealand cricketer. He played in 20 first-class and 23 List A matches for Central Districts from 1981 to 1988.

See also
 List of Central Districts representative cricketers

References

External links
 

1957 births
Living people
New Zealand cricketers
Central Districts cricketers
Cricketers from Nelson, New Zealand